Numerius Fabius Pictor ( 273–266 BC) was a Roman senator and military commander.

In 273 BC, he was among a group of ambassadors sent by the Senate to the court of Egyptian king Ptolemy II Philadelphus. In 266, Pictor became consul alongside Decimus Junius Pera. The two men campaigned in Umbria against Sassina and in Calabria against the Sallentini and Messapians, both times successfully. For each victory the consuls celebrated triumphs.

He was probably uncle of Quintus Fabius Pictor, the first Roman historian.

References
 
 

3rd-century BC Roman consuls
Pictor, Numerius
Roman patricians
Roman triumphators